The 1983 New Orleans Saints season was the team’s 17th as a member of the National Football League. They improved on their previous season’s output of 4–5, winning eight games. Despite the improvement, the team failed to qualify for the playoffs for the seventeenth consecutive season.

With an 8–7 record going into the final game of the season at the Superdome against the Los Angeles Rams, the Saints, with a win, would have finished with their first winning season and their first playoff berth. However, Rams kicker Mike Lansford kicked a 42-yard field goal with :06 left to defeat the Saints 26–24, and advance to the playoffs. Other than that field goal, the Rams did not score a single point on offense, instead scoring via a punt return for a touchdown, two interception returns for touchdowns, and a safety.

Two weeks earlier the Saints lost to the New England Patriots in shocking conditions with sleet and snow – with the only score being set up by Patriot Ricky Smith returning the initial kickoff to the 3-yard line. As of 2021, this game remains the most recent 7–0 result in NFL history, with only two games since seeing just one score, both a single field goal.

Another damaging loss came on Monday Night Football in week 12, when the New York Jets rallied from a 14-point deficit by scoring 17 unanswered points in the fourth quarter, capped off by a 76-yard punt return touchdown by Kirk Springs, to stun the Saints 31–28. The Saints had a chance to force overtime in the closing seconds, but Morten Andersen missed badly to the left on a 51-yard field goal attempt.

Offseason

NFL draft

Personnel

Staff

Roster

Schedule

Standings

Notes

References 

New Orleans Saints seasons
New Orleans Saints
New